Pandanus simplex is an economically important species of Pandanus (screwpine) endemic to the Philippines. It is commonly known as karagumoy (also spelled karagomoy or karagomoi) or kalagimay. Its leaves and fibers are used widely in the Philippines for thatching, ropes, and weaving various traditional handicrafts like baskets and mats.

Taxonomy
Pandanus simplex was first described by the American botanist Elmer Drew Merrill in 1905. It is classified under the subgenus Kurzia, section Utilissima.

Description
Prop roots emerge from the trunk near the base. The leaves are spirally-arranged leaves at the end of branches.

Karagumoy is dioecious with separate male and female plants. The fruits resemble jackfruit. They have an elongated capsule shape covered with small spines.

Habitat
Karagumoy is found in forests in low to medium elevations.

Uses
Karagumoy leaves and fibers are widely utilized in the Philippines in weaving mats, baskets, hats, and other traditional woven products. They are also used to make ropes or thatching. They are cultivated in farms. Mature leaves are harvested once every three months. The fruits and shoots of the karagumoy are also edible.

Gallery

See also
Pandanus amaryllifolius
Pandanus odoratissimus
Pandanus utilis
 Domesticated plants and animals of Austronesia

References

External links

simplex
Flora of the Philippines
Taxa named by Elmer Drew Merrill